Dimitrios Stathis (born 1909, date of death unknown) was a Greek sports shooter. He competed in the 25 m pistol event at the 1936 Summer Olympics.

References

External links
 

1909 births
Year of death missing
Greek male sport shooters
Olympic shooters of Greece
Shooters at the 1936 Summer Olympics
Place of birth missing
20th-century Greek people